Gary may refer to: 
Gary (given name), a common masculine given name, including a list of people and fictional characters with the name
Gary, Indiana, the largest city named Gary

Places 
Iran
Gary, Iran, Sistan and Baluchestan Province
United States
Gary (Tampa), Florida
Gary, Maryland
Gary, Minnesota
Gary, South Dakota
Gary, West Virginia
Gary – New Duluth, a neighborhood in Duluth, Minnesota
Gary Air Force Base, San Marcos, Texas
Gary City, Texas

Ships
USS Gary (DE-61), a destroyer escort launched in 1943
USS Gary (CL-147), scheduled to be a light cruiser, but canceled prior to construction in 1945
USS Gary (FFG-51), a frigate, commissioned in 1984
USS Thomas J. Gary (DE-326), a destroyer escort commissioned in 1943

People and fictional characters
Gary (surname), including a list of people with the name
Gary (rapper), South Korean rapper and entertainer
Gary (Argentine singer), Argentine singer of cuarteto songs

Other uses
Gary: Tank Commander, a British television sitcom
Gary (mango), a mango cultivar
4735 Gary, an asteroid
Gary Elks, an American football team from 1920 to 1923

See also
 Garry (disambiguation)
 Gareth (given name)
 Garath (disambiguation)
 Garaidh, a given name